The MTV Video Music Award for Video of the Year is the most prestigious competitive award and the final award presented at the annual MTV Video Music Awards. The award was created by the U.S. network MTV to honor artists with the best music videos. Originally, all winners were determined by a special panel of music video directors, producers, and record company executives. Since the  awards, winners of major categories are determined by viewers' votes through MTV's website, while the jury decides in the technical categories.

Taylor Swift holds the record for the most wins, with a total of three for "Bad Blood", "You Need to Calm Down", and All Too Well: The Short Film. Eminem holds the record for the most nominations, with seven as lead artist. David Lee Roth, U2, and Lady Gaga are the only acts to have had two Video of the Year nominations in a single ceremony. Swift is the first artist to win Video of the Year for a self-directed video, with All Too Well: The Short Film.

Recipients

See also
 Grammy Award for Best Music Video
 MTV Europe Music Award for Best Video

Notes

References

External links
 

MTV Video Music Awards
Awards established in 1984